Else Merke (15 June 1920 – 6 March 2005) was a member of the State Council of East Germany, the country's collective head of state, from 1963 until 1971.

Life 

Merke was born in 1920 in Stargard, then part of Prussia. After school she worked on her parents' farm. At the end of World War II, Merke was expelled and resettled in the Soviet occupation zone. Merke and her husband became farmers in Schenkenberg, where they founded one of the first LPG collective farms in 1952.

In 1948 Merke joined the Democratic Farmers' Party of Germany (DBD). Between 1963 and 1990 Merke was on her party's executive committee.

In 1950 she became a member of the Democratic Women's League of Germany (DFD), and later its deputy chairwoman in 1964. She participated in the 1953 WIDF Congress in Copenhagen.

Merke was awarded the Clara Zetkin Medal in 1958, the Patriotic Order of Merit in 1966, and the Star of People's Friendship in 1985. She died in 2005 in Schenkenberg.

References 
 
 

1920 births
2005 deaths
People from Stargard
People from the Province of Pomerania
Democratic Farmers' Party of Germany politicians
Democratic Women's League of Germany members
Members of the State Council of East Germany
Members of the 1st Volkskammer
Members of the 2nd Volkskammer
Members of the 3rd Volkskammer
Members of the 4th Volkskammer
Members of the 5th Volkskammer
Members of the 6th Volkskammer
Members of the 7th Volkskammer
Members of the 8th Volkskammer
Female members of the Volkskammer
Recipients of the Patriotic Order of Merit